David John Richardson  (born 1964) is a Professor and Deputy Director of the Optoelectronics Research Centre at the University of Southampton.

Education
Richardson was educated at St George’s Roman Catholic School, Southampton and Taunton’s College. He completed his Bachelor of Science degree and PhD in Physics at the University of Sussex in 1989.

Career and research
Richardson is a pioneer in the field of photonics, best known for his work on fibre optics and their applications. He has played a leading role in developing techniques to scale the data-carrying capacity of future optical communication networks to keep up with society's demand for ever increasing internet bandwidth. He has developed optical fibres of high performance – capable, for example, of transmitting large quantities of data across the internet at high speed.

Richardson was also one of the first to demonstrate the potential of compact, flexible, pulsed fibre lasers operating over a broad range of powers, pulse durations and wavelengths. Over many years he has extended the performance limits of fibre lasers, making them strong contenders to conventional lasers and contributing to their commercial success. His work extends to fibres capable of delivering kilowatts of optical power for manufacturing with lasers.

References

Living people
British physicists
Fellows of the Royal Society
Fellows of the Royal Academy of Engineering
1964 births